La intrusa  ("The Intruder") is a 1954 Mexican film. It was directed by Miguel Morayta, produced by Fernando de Fuentes, and starring Rosario Granados, Eduardo Fajardo and Evangelina Elizondo.

Plot
A young woman, Gabriela (Rosario Granados) goes to a farm and one of the owners, Raúl (Eduardo Fajardo) falls in love with her. However, a jealous woman, Tania (Evangelina Elizondo) tries to eliminate her.

Cast
 Rosario Granados - Gabriela Almeida
 Eduardo Fajardo - Raúl Gómez de Fonseca
 Evangelina Elizondo - Tania
 Luis Beristáin - Francisco Salvatierra
 Carlos Martínez Baena - Don Pedro
 Miguel Ángel Ferriz - Doctor Suárez
 Enrique García Álvarez - Tío Juan
 Matilde Palou - Tía Rita
 María Herrero - Margarita Salvatierra
 Salvador Quiroz - Doctor
 Rosa Elena Durgel - Rosaura
 Lupe Suárez - Valeria	
 Rodolfo Landa

References

External links
 

1954 films
1950s Spanish-language films
Films directed by Miguel Morayta
Mexican drama films
1954 drama films
Mexican black-and-white films
1950s Mexican films